Harold Everett Hughes (February 10, 1922 – October 23, 1996) was the 36th Governor of Iowa from 1963 until 1969, and a United States senator from Iowa from 1969 until 1975. He began his political career as a Republican but changed his affiliation to the Democratic Party in 1962.

Background
Hughes was born in 1922 in Ida Grove, Iowa. He married Eva Mercer in August 1941. In 1942, his brother Jesse was killed in a car accident at the age of 23. Hughes and his wife had a daughter in 1942, and shortly afterward Hughes was drafted. He served in the U.S. Army, fighting in the North African campaign, and was court-martialed for assaulting an officer. The trial resulted in Hughes' being sent to fight in Sicily in 1943. He became ill and another soldier took his place on a landing craft at Anzio. The craft exploded, killing his replacement and many others.

Hughes' interest in politics was stirred by involvement in the trucking industry. He became a manager of a local trucking business, and then began organizing independent truckers. Hughes started the Iowa Better Trucking Bureau and was eventually elected to the State Commerce Commission board, which he served from 1958 to 1962, including a term as its chairman.

Early years
In 1952, after years as an alcoholic, Hughes attempted suicide. He described in his book how he climbed into a bathtub (to make the mess easier to clean up) with a shotgun, ready to pull the trigger, when he cried out to God for help. He had a spiritual experience that changed the course of his life. He began to pray and study the Bible diligently, and even considered a career in the ministry. He also embraced the Alcoholics Anonymous program of recovery and started an AA group in Ida Grove, Iowa, in 1955.

1962 gubernatorial campaign
Hughes grew up as a Republican in a heavily Republican area, but was persuaded to switch parties. His service on the State Commerce Commission also brought him in contact with the Interstate Commerce Commission and national politics. He then ran for Governor of Iowa on the Democratic ticket and defeated incumbent Republican Norman Erbe in 1962.

A major issue in the campaign was legalization of liquor-by-the-drink. Iowa allowed only beer to be consumed over the bar. Liquor and wine could be purchased only in state liquor stores and private clubs. Hughes became a proponent of liquor-by-the-drink. A short time after he was elected, the state adopted a new system of alcohol control.

Governor of Iowa
Hughes served as governor from 1963 to 1969. During this time, he continued to reach out, as a Christian and an alcoholic in recovery, to people still suffering. He established a treatment program in the state and was an effective spokesman for a more enlightened view of the role of alcohol in society. The new treatment program was viewed as an alternative to the state mental hospitals. Hughes wrote that the goal was to reach alcoholics "before they reach rock bottom."

A death penalty opponent, Hughes reached out to President John F. Kennedy to request he commute the death sentence of Victor Feguer, who had been convicted on federal murder charges. The President was the only one who could commute the sentence, but Kennedy thought the crime was so brutal that he denied the request.

Meanwhile Hughes's political career continued to gain strength. He made a speech seconding the nomination of Lyndon B. Johnson at the 1964 Democratic convention—a decision he would eventually regret—and gained national recognition as a liberal governor as well as a promising national figure in the Democratic Party. Trade missions abroad, and a tour of Vietnam with other governors, provided him with foreign policy experience.

In his 1964 bid for reelection as governor, Hughes's opponent, Evan Hultman, called attention to Hughes's brief relapse into alcoholism in 1954. In a debate, Hultman charged that Hughes's failure to acknowledge the relapse publicly showed that Hughes lacked integrity. Hughes responded, "I am an alcoholic and will be until the day I die.... But with God's help I'll never touch a drop of alcohol again. Now, can we talk about the issues of this campaign?" According to the Des Moines Register, "The reaction of the crowd was immediate and nearly unanimous." Later, the Register editorialized, "In our opinion, any man or woman who wins that battle and successfully puts the pieces of his or her life back together again deserves commendation, not censure." Hughes won by a landslide.

In 1966, Iowa, like other states, experienced Democratic losses, but Hughes survived. It was at that time that his friendship with Robert F. Kennedy started, and it was Kennedy who encouraged him to run for a Senate seat. The next years were difficult, in the wake of the 1968 assassinations of Kennedy and of Martin Luther King Jr., racial unrest in Iowa, and his increasing disappointment with American policy in Vietnam and the leadership of the Johnson administration.

U.S. Senator from Iowa

1968 campaign 
At the 1968 Democratic National Convention, Hughes was giving a nominating speech for anti-war candidate Eugene McCarthy when violent demonstrations erupted on the streets of Chicago. In the general election in 1968, Hughes was a heavy favorite to defeat Republican candidate David Stanley, a Muscatine, Iowa state senator for the U.S. Senate seat being vacated by Republican Bourke Hickenlooper of Cedar Rapids. Hughes won but by only 4,200 votes.

Leader on alcoholism and narcotics addiction 
As a U.S. Senator, Hughes persuaded the chairman of the Senate's Labor and Public Welfare Committee to establish a Special Sub-committee on Alcoholism and Narcotics, chaired by Hughes himself. This subcommittee, which gave unprecedented attention to the subject, held public hearings on July 23–25, 1969. A number of people in recovery testified, including Academy Award-winning actress Mercedes McCambridge, National Council on Alcoholism founder Marty Mann, and AA co-founder Bill W. In his autobiography, The Man from Ida Grove: A Senator's Personal Story, Hughes writes that he asked a dozen other well-known people in recovery to present public testimony, but all declined. The hearings were considered by some in AA a threat to anonymity and sobriety.

Hughes also talked about the need for treatment of drug addiction. He stated that "treatment is virtually nonexistent because addiction is not recognized as an illness." The hearings, and subsequent events related to alcoholism and addiction, were not given much press attention because the press was more interested in the Vietnam War, poverty, and other critical issues. Legislation creating the National Institute on Drug Abuse was not passed until 1974.

The goal of the Comprehensive Drug Abuse Prevention and Control Act of 1970, considered a "major milestone" in the nation's efforts to deal with alcohol abuse and alcoholism, was "to help millions of alcoholics recover and save thousands of lives on highways, reduce crime, decrease the welfare rolls, and cut down the appalling economic waste from alcoholism."

Touted as a presidential "dark horse" 
In early 1970, Hughes began to get press recognition as a "dark horse candidate" for the 1972 presidential election. Columnist David Broder described him as "a very dark horse, but the only Democrat around who excites the kind of personal enthusiasm the Kennedys used to generate."
In 1971, Hughes denounced Nixon's secret wiretapping, done through the FBI.

He seemed to observers to be an almost reluctant candidate, though, and a bit too much of a "mystic" for the Washington press corps. Columnist Mary McGrory wrote of him: "He hates small talk, he likes a heavy rap. He talks about religion, and about drugs and alcohol. He hated being trotted out to cajole financiers wanting to look him over before opening the checkbook. His staff had to prod him to call party chairmen. Hughes preferred a session with the kids at the local treatment centers." The Washington establishment was not too surprised when he dropped out of the race.

According to Hunter S. Thompson, Gary Hart suggested after the '72 campaign that Hughes might have been the only Democratic candidate who could have defeated Nixon.

Decision not to seek re-election 
On September 5, 1973, Hughes announced that, after a long period of soul-searching, he would retire from the Senate when his term was completed. He said that, for "profoundly personal religious reasons" he would seek "a new kind of challenge and spiritual opportunity," and would "continue efforts in alcoholism and drug treatment fields, working for social causes and world peace." He said: "Rightly or wrongly, I believe that I can move more people through a spiritual approach more effectively than I have been able to achieve through the political approach."

In 1974, his last full year in the Senate, he succeeded in passing legislation that extended and expanded the original 1970 act. He was invited to the signing of the bill by President Nixon, but "couldn't bring myself to attend, since his administration had fought it every inch of the way." Democratic Congressman John Culver defeated Stanley to succeed Hughes in 1974.

Post-Senate years and retirement
After he left the Senate, Hughes devoted himself to lay religious work for two foundations based in Washington and also founded a religious retreat at Cedar Point Farms, Maryland. He had been active in prayer groups while serving in the Senate, and the last few chapters of his autobiography gave this aspect of his life special prominence. Hughes partnered with former Nixon Aide Charles Colson in his religious work, and even portrayed himself in the 1978 motion picture, Born Again, starring Dean Jones as Colson. He also remained a strong advocate for services to chemically dependent people.

After his retirement, Hughes served as a consultant to the Senate and the Senate Judiciary Committee for a year. He then started the Harold Hughes foundation and opened the Harold Hughes Center to combat alcoholism. After some time in Iowa, Hughes considered running for governor in 1982 but did not. Hughes moved to a retirement community in Glendale, Arizona, where he died. His remains were returned to Iowa and buried in the Ida Grove cemetery in Ida Grove, Iowa.

Hughes and his first wife, whom he married in 1941, divorced in 1987. Six weeks after the divorce, he married his former secretary, Julie Holm, with whom he had been living with for a year after he was separated from his soon to be ex-wife. Hughes moved to Arizona and lived in a single-family home with his second wife, while his first wife lived in a one-bedroom apartment in Iowa. Hughes and his former wife got into bitter alimony and child support battles in the late 1980s and early 1990s. Hughes' former wife claimed that he had completely cut off her annuities and health insurance, while Hughes claimed that he himself did not have money. Ultimately, Hughes was ordered to pay back over $10,000 to his former wife, which she successfully collected from his estate. Because of the Harold Hughes Center's declining fortunes, Hughes owed approximately $80,000 to creditors in the 1990s. Combined with increasing medical expenses and the court-ordered alimony payments, Hughes' debts increased dramatically during his last years, and he died virtually bankrupt. Hughes' former wife, who lived comfortably in Iowa, died in 2017.

See also
Hughes–Ryan Act

References

Notes
 Hughes, Harold E. The Man From Ida Grove: A Senator's Personal Story . Waco, Tex.: Word Books, 1979; Larew, James C. "A Party Reborn: Harold Hughes and the Iowa Democrats." Palimpsest 59 (September/October 1978): 148–61.
 Anonymous. "Conversation with Senator Harold Hughes." Addiction 92 (February 1997): 137–149. Foreword by Senator Edward Kennedy.
 Hughes, Harold E., with Dick Schneider. The Man From Ida Grove: A Senator's Personal Story . Lincoln, VA: Chosen Books, 1979.
 Larew, James C. "A Party Reborn: Harold Hughes and the Iowa Democrats." Palimpsest 59 (September/October 1978): 148–61.
 Smith, Thomas S. "The Vietnam Era in Iowa Politics." Palimpsest 63 (September/October 1982): 138–41.

External links
 
 as Harold Hughes 
 as Harold E Hughes

|-

|-

|-

|-

1922 births
1996 deaths
20th-century American politicians
American Christian pacifists
United States Army personnel of World War II
American United Methodists
Democratic Party governors of Iowa
Democratic Party United States senators from Iowa
Iowa Democrats
Iowa Republicans
Governors of Iowa
Methodist pacifists
Military personnel from Iowa
People from Ida County, Iowa
Candidates in the 1972 United States presidential election
University of Iowa alumni
United States Army soldiers